Dixa is a genus of midges, belonging to the family Dixidae.

The genus was described in 1818 by Johann Wilhelm Meigen.

The genus has cosmopolitan distribution.

Species include:
 Dixa dilatata
 Dixa nebulosa
 Dixa nubilipennis

References

Dixidae
Nematocera genera